Rosmeri Marval (born as Rosmeri Karina Marval Diaz on December 18, 1991 in Los Teques, Venezuela) is a Venezuelan actress and model. She rose to prominence with her antagonistic role in the hit Venevision series Somos tú y yo in 2007. She has had numerous modeling and acting spots since, including her recent starring role in Entre tu amor y mi amor.

Personal life 
Marval is the daughter of Elena Díaz and Rodolfo Marval. She's been in a relationship with actor, drummer and singer Arán de las Casas whom she shared credit with on Venevisión's series, Somos tú y yo, since 2008.  She married De las Casas on October 1, 2016.

Filmography

References

External links 

Living people
1991 births
People from Los Teques
People from Caracas
Venezuelan telenovela actresses
21st-century Venezuelan actresses
Venezuelan female models